William Michael Duane (26 January 1915 – 21 January 1997) was an Irish born, British teacher known for his progressive educational views, his belief in inclusivity and a multi-racial approach, his encouragement of informal relationships between staff and pupils and his opposition to corporal punishment. He was also the head of the controversial short-lived Risinghill School in Islington.

Biography

Early life and education
Duane was born on 26 January 1915 in Dublin, Ireland to John Joseph Duane (1888–1922) and Mary Ellen Fogarty (1893-1975). When Duane was 7 his father died when he was shot in Waterford during the Civil War; three years later Duane and his mother moved to London. He was educated at Dominican School at Archway, London before going to the Jesuits' School, Stamford Hill. He trained as a teacher at the Institute of Education, University of London, before taking up at teaching post at Dame Alice Owen's School, Islington, until he joined World War II in 1940.

War service
During the War he enlisted, and was promoted to Second Lieutenant(1941), Captain (1942), Staff Captain (1942) and Major (1945).  In 1946 he received medals for bravery including the Chevalier De L'Ordre De Leopold II Avec Palme and the Croix De Guerre Avec Palme. He was demobilised in 1946

Post-War career
After the War he briefly returned to Dame Alice Owen's School before becoming a lecturer at the Institute of Education.

In 1948 Duane was appointed the head teacher of a newly opened school, Howe Dell Secondary School in Hatfield, Hertfordshire, and at the time was one of the youngest heads in the country. Duane was given five years 'with no questioned asked' to establish the school. Until the school was ready, Duane was temporarily appointed the head of Beaumont Secondary Modern School in St. Albans for one term. Duane took charge of Howe Dell in 1949, and implemented a democratic multi-racial progressive policy which rejected corporal punishment. Duane's policies were criticised by the authoritarian head of the school governors and he was faced with an inadequate building and pupils with varying levels of education. Duane faced further criticisms after he was appointed a Justice of the Peace and nominate as the Labour Party candidate in the local elections. The school was accused of lack of discipline and impropriety and failed a HMI inspection in 1950. The Governors gave a vote of no confidence and called for Duane's dismissal. The case for dismissal was thrown out by the Hertfordshire County Council Education Committee, but Duane resigned and the school was closed in 1951.

Duane moved onto another headship at Alderman Woodrow Secondary Boys' School, Lowestoft, Suffolk in 1952. His time at this school was less problematic, though he did come into conflict with the Suffolk Education Authority over the allocation grammar school places. After a good inspection report, Duane felt it was time to move on and left in 1959.

Risinghill School

In 1959, Duane became the head of the comprehensive Risinghill School in Islington, the post which was to make him a famous figure. The secondary school was an amalgamation of four other local schools and included pupils of nineteen different nationalities from variety of backgrounds and abilities. He was also faced with shortages of staff and a poorly built building. Duane introduced a non-authoritarian programme of pastoral care, pupil democracy, frank sex education, close co-operation with parents, promotion of creativity and multi-culturalism. He refused to expel pupils, as he felt it was illegal as secondary education was compulsory. Duane clashed with the London County Council and the HM Inspectorate over his policies and in 1962 the school was brought into controversy over an account of Duane's sex education lessons which were published anonymously by Duane. The school received an hostile inspection report which recommended the reintroduction of corporal punishment and expulsion, but Duane refused. In 1965, the newly formed Inner London Education Authority decided to close the school.

The case became well known largely due to the publication of, Risinghill: Death of a Comprehensive School by Leila Berg in 1968.

Later career
After Risinghill controversy, Duane was never appointed a head teacher again. He became a lecturer at Garnett College of Education and wrote and lectured on his educational philosophies. In 1977 he received a MPhil from the University of Nottingham for his research on The Terrace, an experimental ROSLA (raising of the school leaving age) scheme, jointly organised by Royston Lambert head of Dartington Hall School and Alec Clegg of the West Riding Education Authority, to provide education for 15-year-olds from Northcliffe School in Conisbrough who no longer saw relevance in standard education. He later published his research in 1995.

Death 
Michael Duane died in Exeter on 21 January 1997, shortly before his 82nd birthday.

Primary sources
The papers of Michael Duane are held in the Archives of the Institute of Education, University of London and a full catalogue is available on-line.

Publications and writings

Writings on Duane

 
 
 
Risinghill: Death of a Comprehensive School, Leila Berg, Penguin Books

See also
Summerhill School - Another, more, progressive education boarding school in Leiston, Suffolk
Leila Berg - Journalist and a writer on education and children's rights

References

External links
Papers of Michael Duane at the Institute of Education, University of London
 Risinghill School website

1915 births
1997 deaths
People from County Dublin
Youth empowerment people
Heads of schools in England
Irish schoolteachers
Irish emigrants to the United Kingdom